John Henry Stirzaker (7 February 1869 – 28 September 1948) was an English professional footballer. He played as a defender and spent his entire professional career with Blackpool.

After joining Blackpool from Fleetwood Rangers in 1894, Stirzaker started Blackpool's first-ever game in the Football League, a 3–1 defeat at Lincoln City on 5 September 1896. He went on to appear in all but the final three games of the 1896–97 season, scoring four goals. Along with two other imports from Fleetwood Rangers – Bob Birkett and Jack Scott – Stirzaker was the mainstay of Blackpool's fledgling Football League team of the early part of the 20th century.

In 1897–98, Stirzaker made 25 league appearances and scored one goal. Over the next three seasons, he made 93 league appearances and scored nine goals (six of which came in  1900–01).

Stirzaker stood in as an emergency goalkeeper for Blackpool's opening game of the 1901–02 season, when the club's first-choice 'keeper, Joe Dorrington, was unavailable.

In 1902–03, Stirzaker made only nine appearances after being edged out of the team by utility player Geordie Anderson, who could either play in defence or in the forward line.

Stirzaker's final game for Blackpool occurred on 13 April 1903, in the final game of the season – a 2–1 victory over Chesterfield at Bloomfield Road.

Death
Stirzaker died on 28 September 1948 in Victoria, Australia. He was 79.

Notes

References

External links
John Henry Stirzaker at Find A Grave

1869 births
1948 deaths
English footballers
Blackpool F.C. players
People from Fleetwood
Fleetwood Rangers F.C. players
English Football League players
Association football defenders